Karrer is a surname. Notable people with the name include:

 Annie May Hurd Karrer (1893–?), American plant physiologist
 Chris Karrer(born 1947), German guitarist and composer
 Felix Karrer (1825–1903), Austrian geologist
 Josef Karrer (born 1939), German handball player
 Karl Karrer (1815–1886), Swiss politician
 Paul Karrer (1889–1971), Swiss organic chemist

See also

Karre
Karrer (crater), lunar impact crater